Blanca de la Cerda y Lara ( – 1347) was a Spanish noblewoman.

She was the daughter of Fernando de la Cerda (1275–1322) and Juana Núñez de Lara, called "la Palomilla".

Blanca was the second wife of Juan Manuel, Prince of Villena (1282–1349), a member of the junior branch of the Castilian royal house.  Their daughter Juana Manuel of Castile married the (illegitimate) Henry II of Castile and became queen consort of Castile.

Ancestry

References

1310s births
1347 deaths
Year of birth uncertain
Spanish duchesses
14th-century Spanish women
14th-century Castilians
Blanca de La Cerda